The P'okp'ung-ho, officially the Chonma-215 and Chonma-216 are North Korean main battle tanks (MBT) developed in the 1990s. The tank may incorporate technology found in the T-62, T-72, and Ch'onma-ho MBTs. Outside parties codename the tank M-2002 because the tank went through performance trials on February 16, 2002 (therefore being officially confirmed by outside sources), although the tank may have been in existence since 1992.

The P'okp'ung-ho is only known to be used in North Korea.

Origin 

After the dissolution of the Soviet Union, a significant number of T-72s were decommissioned from Soviet service and scrapped for metal. North Korea is believed to have acquired some of these scrapped T-72s and obtained core technology for use on the P'okp'ung-ho through reverse engineering. It is also believed North Korea acquired 3 samples of T-80 in early 1990s from Afghanistan. North Korea's interest in the T-90 was demonstrated in August 2001 when Kim Jong-il visited the Omsktransmash defense plant which builds the T-90 during his visit to Russia. However, North Korea failed to acquire T-90 since then, as South Korean and Russian governments agreed to cease supplying arms technology to North Korea since 1994.

The destruction of Iraqi T-72s by western tanks such as the M1 Abrams during the Gulf War demonstrated the poor combat performance of the older export variants of T-72s against top-of-the-line Western models. North Korea decided to significantly modernize its tank fleet to bridge the performance gap between its Ch'onma-ho MBTs and the South Korean K1 MBTs, which has similar performance to the early models of the American M1 Abrams. However, economic struggles and a lack of several core technologies seem to have prevented North Korea from achieving high production numbers for the P'okp'ung-ho before the late 2000s.

Production history 
The first P'okp'ung-ho is believed to have been produced in 1992 in the Ryu Kyong-su Tank Factory, located in Sinhung, South Hamgyong province under the Second Economic Committee and Second Academy of Defense Science. The capabilities of later variants have been augmented significantly. Because of North Korea's limited industrial capability, compounded by the fact that North Korea has also spent most of the resources allotted for the development of the P'okp'ung-ho on its nuclear program, North Korea was believed to possess fewer than 250 of these tanks in 2007. However, production seems to have picked up starting in 2010. The tank was witnessed by parties outside of North Korea in 2002 and thus codenamed the M-2002. The P'okp'ung-ho was shown to the public during a North Korean parade in 2010, as well as during military exercises in 2012.

Design characteristics 
Unclassified images of the P'okp'ung-ho finally surfaced in 2010, which showed the tank design appeared to be developed from the later models of the Chonma-ho and influenced by the T-72. The P'ok'pung-ho has better mobility, survivability and firepower than the Ch'onma-ho. Capabilities of the tank have been speculated to be nearly identical to T-90, however the limited access to technical information regarding the P'okp'ung-ho makes accurate comparisons difficult.

Armament 
The P'okp'ung-ho's primary armament was almost certainly the 2A20 115 mm gun in early examples; however, later versions seemed to be armed with the 2A26/2A46 125 mm smoothbore gun. which fires AP rounds produced in North Korea. The tank also has a heavy KPV anti-aircraft machine gun and a coaxial machine gun, as well as four smoke grenade launchers on the each side of the turret. The tank does not have the capability to fire ATGMs from its main gun. A model displayed at an April 2017 parade was equipped with two MANPADS launchers at the rear of the turret, two ATGM launchers mounted on the left side of the turret, and twin automatic grenade launchers mounted on the right side of commander hatch.

Hull and armor 
Although the engine compartment and the layout show some resemblance to a T-72 hull, the chassis is basically a heavily modified version of T-62, with greater length and an additional pair of road wheels. The glacis plate of the Pokpung-ho is heavily sloped and protected by appliqué armor in the initial version with ERA added in later versions. The turret is reinforced with wedge-shaped armor modules in Pokpung-Ho I and seems to be protected by composite armour similar to the later export variant T-72M1 in Pokpung-Ho II with ERA added in Pokpung-Ho III. The panels along the tracks seem to be made of a light laminar armour.

Engine 
Although the horsepower of the P'okp'ung-ho's engine has been speculated to be as high as 1500, the engine is likely to have around 1000–1100 horsepower. It has been reported that North Korea rejected developing the  turbine engine of the T-80, judging that it would not be suitable for a tank engagement within the narrow, mountainous terrain of Korea, and that it would prove to be of little difference on defensive missions. During aggressive missions, the P'okp'ung-ho can quickly engage the enemy due to its already excellent speed and acceleration, which is the basis of North Korean tank tactics.

Internal systems 
The fire control system of the P'okp'ung-ho is relatively modern and based on the presence of a meteorological mast is almost certainly computerized, and some reports claim that it may be based on the Chieftain FCS, which Iran may have illegally exchanged for North Korean technology. If the P'okp'ung-ho's FCS is based on the T-72's, it may implement the PNK-3 or PNK-4 day and night sighting system with the 1K13-49 periscope combined passive/active sight guidance system. However the night sighting system is most likely to be the same with obsolete T-62. The quality of the equipment are likely inferior to the South Korean counterparts, but there is no proof for this claim.

The P'okp'ung-ho also has an infrared sensor (TPN-3-49 or TPN-4), a laser rangefinder and a search light, all of which allow the P'okp'ung-ho to operate during the night.

Models 
 Chonma-215 – the first actual 'Pokpung-Ho', it mounts a 115 mm 2A20 smoothbore gun and has a new turret seemingly augmented with composite armour. ERA was also fitted on the front glacis. First observed publicly during the October 10, 2010 military parade. SA-7 MANPADS can also be fitted.
 Chonma-216 – Currently the most advanced variant of the 'Pokpung-Ho', it uses the 2A26 125 mm smoothbore cannon; this version possesses most of the traits of the Chonma-215 but has additional reactive armour on the turret front and forward part of the turret roof and is also seen fitted with Bulsae-3 and SA-16.
Songun-915 – A newer derivation of the 'Pokpung-ho' series of tanks. It instead has a modified chassis and a massive cast turret fitted with composite armor. It has also been seen fitted with Bulsae-3 and SA-16.

Operators 
  - Estimates range from 200 as of 2010 in the 105th Seoul Ry-Kyong-Su Guards Armored Division to 500 as of 2013. In 2020, estimated production since 2002 is 600 units.

See also 

Ch'onma-ho
Type 96
T-72
T-90
Defense industry of North Korea

References

Bibliography

External links 
 North Korea's new MBT
 Global Security: M-2002 – DPRK's new MBT
 10 October 2010 military parade, display of Pokpung-ho and Chonma-ho tanks

Main battle tanks of North Korea
Post–Cold War main battle tanks
Military vehicles introduced in the 1990s